Chandrai is a village in Pachpadra block of the Barmer district of Rajasthan, India. Chandrai's population is around 855.

References

Villages in Jodhpur district